Wagih Abdel Hakim (born 1 March 1998) is an Egyptian footballer who plays as a midfielder for Ismaily in the Egyptian Premier League.

Club career
Hakim began his career at Ala'ab Damanhour before signing for Ismaily in January 2017.

International career
On 5 June 2017, Hakim made his debut for Egypt in a 1–0 win against Libya, scoring in the 65th minute. Hakim made his second appearance for Egypt in an African Nations Championship game against Morocco on 13 August 2017.

International goals
Scores and results list Egypt's goal tally first.

References

1998 births
Living people
Egyptian footballers
Egypt international footballers
Egyptian Premier League players
Ala'ab Damanhour SC players
Ismaily SC players
Association football wingers